Monarch is an unincorporated community in Kanawha County, West Virginia, United States.

References 

Unincorporated communities in West Virginia
Unincorporated communities in Kanawha County, West Virginia
Populated places on the Kanawha River